The Centers for Space Oceanography (CSO) are an operating division of the Argos Foundation, Inc. CSO was established in August 2004 by a Memorandum of Understanding between the Argos Foundation, the Florida Aerospace Finance Corporation, the Florida Space Research Institute, and North American CLS, Inc. While operating under the corporate umbrella of the Argos Foundation, an executive appointee from each of the founding organizations form the Steering Committee of CSO. The first Chairman of the Steering Committee was Stephen Lee Morgan; the first Executive Director of CSO was Lawrence M. Harvey. In December 2005, NACLS withdrew from the Steering Committee, and was replaced by Gladius, LLC.

CSO exists to develop and operate "data fusion" capabilities involving the observation of the Earth's oceans from space, and tracking items (ranging from man-made assets such as ships, to marine mammals and other animals) from space, enabling researchers to examine and understand the relationship of such "mobiles" with respect to physical oceanographic elements (such as currents, waves, ocean temperature gradients, etc.). Working with a number of Industrial Team partners, CSO and its associated university and agency researchers develop capabilities, which are then made available to the general public at no charge or at cost.  Regionally specific affiliated centers are established to focus attention and resources upon a given region on the Earth's surface. The first such regional center was the Caribbean Center for Ocean Management & Research, established in Florida in 2006.

On 31 January 2006, CSO conducted its First CSO Symposium at Kennedy Space Center, Florida, hosting over 30 attendees from Government, universities, U.S. Federal and Florida agencies, and Industrial Team executives. CSO continues as a division of the not-for-profit Argos Foundation, while the affiliated regional centers are established as separate legal entities controlled by CSO, but in some cases are for-profit organizations.

References

External links 
Argos Foundation
Caribbean Center for Ocean Management & Research

Oceanography